The slingjaw wrasse (Epibulus insidiator) is a species of wrasse from the family Labridae which is native to the tropical waters of the Indo-Pacific where it occurs around coral reefs. This species is of minor importance to local commercial fisheries and can be found in the aquarium trade. Relatively mundane at first glance, this fish is notable for its highly protrusible jaws.

Description
The most notable feature of the sling-jaw wrasse is that the mouth of this species is armed with highly protrusible jaws which unfold into a tube which is easily half its head length (see below). The males of this species are greyish-brown with orange on the back, a yellowish transverse bar on the flank and a pale grey head which is marked with a thin black stripe running through the eye. The scales of the male's body are edged with darker pigment. The females can be either bright yellow or dark brown while the juveniles are brown with thin white bars on their flanks and white lines radiating out from their eyes. Intermediately patterned individuals which have yellow blotches, a pale tail and sometimes with black pectoral fins do occur. The dorsal fin has  9–10 spines and 9–11 soft rays while the anal fin has 3 spines and 8–9 soft rays.

The similar latent sling-jaw wrasse (Epibulus brevis) has a more restricted distribution and is smaller, with duller coloured males, the females have black pigment on their pectoral fins and has longer pectoral fins.

Extreme jaw protrusion
The sling-jaw wrasse possesses the most extreme jaw protrusion found among fishes. The species can extend its jaws up to 65% the length of its head. The speed and length to which the jaw protrudes allows it to capture small fish and crustaceans. The genus this species belongs to possess one unique ligament (vomero-interopercular) and two enlarged ligaments (interoperculo-mandibular and premaxilla-maxilla), which along with a few changes to the form of cranial bones, allow it to achieve extreme jaw protrusion.

Distribution
The slingjaw wrasse is found in a wide area of the Indo-Pacific region from the eastern coast of Africa, Madagascar and the Red Sea through the Indian Ocean coasts and islands into the Pacific as far east as Johnston Atoll in Hawaii, although vagrants occur in the main Hawaiian chain. It reaches north to Japan and south to New Caledonia. It is found along the northern coasts of Australia from the Houtman Abrolhos archipelago to reefs in the Coral Sea off Queensland.

Habitat and biology
The slingjaw wrasse is a benthopelagic species which occurs in coral-rich areas of lagoon and seaward reefs, adults are normally found along reef slopes or near drop-offs. They feed on small crustaceans living in the coral and on fishes. It is thought likely that this species is a protogynous hermaphrodite. The colour of the males was observed to become more intense during courtship. Courting males swam with their caudal fin collapsed and held upwards at an angle while the anal fin was folded and stretched downwards. The intensity of the male's colour can return to normal when they feel threatened. When spawning the pair were observed to ascend . Spawning seems to be initiated by the females and has been recorded in March, April, May, July, September and October.

Human uses
The slingjaw wrasse is collected for food in many parts of its range; it is also collected for the aquarium trade. In Guam in the two decades up to 2008 the average body size of the fish caught did not decline.

Taxonomy
Epibulus insidiator was formally described as Sparus insidiator in 1770 by Peter Simon Pallas. In 1815 Georges Cuvier assigned Sparus insidiator to a now monotypic genus, Epibulus, which now alo contains Epibulus brevis, which was described in 2008. E. insidiator is, therefore the type species of the genus Epibulus.

References

External links
 Video of a slingjaw wrasse catching prey by protruding its jaw.
http://www.marinespecies.org/aphia.php?p=taxdetails&id=218972

 

Sling-jaw wrasse
Fish of the Red Sea
Fish described in 1770